Wiremu Hukunui Manaia (died 1892) was a New Zealand tribal leader. Of Māori descent, he identified with the Ngāti Tu hapu Ngāti Ruanui iwi of South Taranaki. He was born in New Zealand.

References

1892 deaths
Ngāti Ruanui people
Year of birth unknown